This page lists Japan-related articles with romanized titles beginning with the letter H. For names of people, please list by surname (i.e., "Tarō Yamada" should be listed under "Y", not "T"). Please also ignore particles (e.g. "a", "an", "the") when listing articles (i.e., "A City with No People" should be listed under "City").

H
H-II
H-IIA
H-IIB
H-II Transfer Vehicle
H2 (manga)

Ha
Habikino, Osaka
Habu
Hachikai, Aichi
Hachiman
Hachinohe, Aomori
Hachinohe Station
Hachiōji, Tokyo
Hadano, Kanagawa
Haebaru, Okinawa
Haga, Hyogo
Hagakure
Hagi, Yamaguchi
Sakutarō Hagiwara
Hagoromo Gakuen Junior College
Haguri District, Aichi
Haibane Renmei
Haibara District, Shizuoka
Haibara, Nara
Haibara, Shizuoka
Haibun
Haiga
Haikai
Haiku
Hajime Sorayama
Chitose Hajime
Hakata Minami Line
Hakata ningyō
Hakata no mori stadium
Hakata Station
Hakata Port Tower
Hakata-ku, Fukuoka
Hakata-Ohshima Bridge
Hakata, Ehime
Hakatanomori Athletic Stadium
Haki, Fukuoka
Hakko Ryu
Hakodate Airport
Hakodate, Hokkaidō
Hakone, Kanagawa
Hakone Tozan Line
Haku
Hakui, Ishikawa
Hakusan, Mie
Hakusui, Kumamoto
Hakuta, Shimane
Halfbreed Saiyan
Chisaki Hama
Hamada, Shimane
Hamaguchi Osachi
Hamaguri rebellion
Hamakita, Shizuoka
Hamamatsu, Shizuoka
Hamamatsuchō Station
Hamana District, Shizuoka
Hamasaka, Hyogo
Ayumi Hamasaki
Hamatama, Saga
Masashi Hamauzu
Hamtaro
Hamura, Tokyo
Han (country subdivision)
Keiko Han
Han unification
Hana Ichi Momme
Hana yori Dango
Hanabiramochi
Hanafuda
Hanamaki, Iwate
Hanami
Hanazakari no Kimitachi E
Hanazono
Hanazono, Wakayama
Hanbō
Handa, Aichi
Handa, Tokushima
Hankyū Kōbe Line
Hankyu Kyoto Line
Hankyu Railway
Hannan
Hanno, Saitama
Hanoura, Tokushima
Hanshin Electric Railway
Hanshin Tigers
Hanwa Line
Hanyō
Hanyu, Saitama
Yuzuru Hanyuda
Hanzan, Kagawa
Hara Takashi
Hara Tamiki
Masato Harada
Hamajima, Mie
Harajuku
Harajuku Station
Haramachi, Fukushima
Hiroshi Harashima
Harem anime
Harima Province
Harima, Hyogo
Harry Parkes
Haruhi, Aichi
Haruka Teno
Haruno, Kochi
Haruno, Shizuoka
Hasama, Ōita
T. Hasegawa
Hasegawa Tōhaku
Hashima
Hashima, Gifu,
Hashima District, Gifu
Hashima Island
Hashimoto Gahō
Ryutaro Hashimoto
Hashimoto Shinkichi
Hashimoto, Wakayama
Hasuda, Saitama
Hasumi, Shimane
Hata District, Kochi
Tsutomu Hata
Hatamoto
Hatasho, Shiga
Hatogaya, Saitama
Ichirō Hatoyama
Hatsukaichi, Hiroshima
Masaaki Hatsumi
Hatto, Tottori
Katsura Hattori
Hawai, Tottori
Hayabusa
Yoshiki Hayama
Hayama, Kochi
Hayami District, Ōita
Hayami Yuji
Miki Hayasaka
Hayashi Senjuro
Megumi Hayashibara
Hayashima, Okayama
Hayato, Kagoshima
Hazu District, Aichi
Hazu, Aichi

He
Heda, Shizuoka
Heguri, Nara
Heian period
Heiji Rebellion
Heisei
Heiwa, Aichi
Heki, Yamaguchi
Hekiganroku
Hekinan, Aichi
Hello Kitty
Hellsing
Henohenomoheji
Hentai
Hentai games
Hepburn romanization

Hi
Hiba District, Hiroshima
Hibakujumoku
Hibari Misora
Hida Mountains
Hida Province
Hida, Gifu
Hidaka District, Wakayama
Hidaka Subprefecture
Hidaka, Hyōgo
Hidaka, Kōchi
Hidaka, Saitama
Hidaka, Wakayama
Ken Hidaka
The Hidden Fortress
Hiezu, Tottori
Higashi, Okinawa
Higashi-ku, Fukuoka
Higashi-ku, Hamamatsu
Higashi-ku, Hiroshima
Higashi-ku, Nagoya
Higashi-ku, Niigata
Higashi-ku, Okayama
Higashi-ku, Sakai
Higashi-ku, Sapporo
Higashi-yamato, Tokyo
Higashiawakura, Okayama
Higashiazai District, Shiga
Higashihiroshima, Hiroshima
Higashiichiki, Kagoshima
Higashiiyayama, Tokushima
Higashiizu, Shizuoka
Higashiizumo, Shimane
Higashikagawa, Kagawa
Higashikamo District, Aichi
Higashikunisaki District, Ōita
Higashikurume, Tokyo
Higashikushira, Kagoshima
Higashimatsuura District, Saga
Higashimatsuyama, Saitama
Higashimorokata District, Miyazaki
Higashimurayama, Tokyo
Higashi Nakatsukasa
Higashine, Yamagata
Higashimuro District, Wakayama
Higashiosaka, Osaka
Higashisefuri, Saga
Higashishirakawa, Gifu
Higashitsuno, Kochi
Higashiura, Aichi
Higashiura, Hyogo
Higashiusuki District, Miyazaki
Higashiuwa District, Ehime
Higashiyama-ku, Kyoto
Higashiyoka, Saga
Higashiyama Kai'i
Higashiyama period
Higashiyoshino, Nara
High School Girls
Higo Province
Higuchi Ichiyō
Susana Higuchi

Hi (cont'd)
Hiji, Ōita
Hijikata Toshizō
Hijikawa, Ehime
Hikami District, Hyōgo
Hikami, Hyogo
Hikari (Shinkansen)
Hikari, Yamaguchi
Hikaru no Go
Hikawa District, Shimane
Hikawa, Shimane
Hiki District, Saitama
Hikigawa, Wakayama
Hikikomori
Hikimi, Shimane
Hikitsuke
Hikone, Shiga
HI-LEX
Himedo, Kumamoto
Himeji, Hyōgo
Himeji Castle
Himeshima, Ōita
Himi, Toyama
Himiko (queen)
Hinamatsuri
Hinase, Okayama
Hino
Hino, Shiga
Hino, Tottori
Hino District, Tottori
Rei Hino
Hinokage, Miyazaki
Hioki District, Kagoshima
Hirado Island
Hirado, Nagasaki
Hiraide Shū
Hiraga Gennai
Hiragana
Hirakata, Osaka
Hiranuma Kiichirō
Hirao, Yamaguchi
Hirara, Okinawa
Hirata, Gifu
Hirata, Shimane
Hiratsuka, Kanagawa
Hideyuki Hirayama
Hirogawa, Wakayama
Hirohito
Hirokawa, Fukuoka
Hiromi
Heisuke Hironaka
Hirose, Shimane
Hiroshige
Hiroshima Peace Memorial
Hiroshima Prefecture
Hiroshima, Hiroshima
Ryōko Hirosue
Kōki Hirota
Hirota, Ehime
Hirukawa, Gifu
His and Her Circumstances
Hisai, Mie
Hisayama, Fukuoka
Hishikari, Kagoshima
History of anime
Historical tale
History of Japan
History of Okinawa
Hita, Ōita
Hitachi Hatsukaze
Hitachi, Ltd.
Hitachi Province
Hitachi, Ibaraki
Hitachi 917
Hitachinaka, Ibaraki
Hitachiōta, Ibaraki
Hitokiri
Yo Hitoto
Hitotsume-kozō
Hitoyoshi, Kumamoto
Hirosaki, Aomori
Hiyama Subprefecture
Hiyayakko
Hiyoshi, Kagoshima
Hiyoshi, Kyoto
Hiwa, Hiroshima
Hiwasa, Tokushima
Hizen Province
Hizen, Saga

Ho
Hofu, Yamaguchi
Hōgen Rebellion
Hohoku, Yamaguchi
Hoi District, Aichi
Hōjō clan
Hōjō Masako
Hōjō Tokimune
Hōjō Tokiuji
Hōjō Tokiyori
Hōjō Yasutoki
Hōjō, Fukuoka
Hōjō, Tottori
Hojojutsu
Hoki Province
Hokkaidō
Hokkaido (dog)
Hokkaido Air System
Hokkaido Bank
Hokkaido Broadcasting
Hokkaido International Airlines
Hokkaido Nippon Ham Fighters
Hokkaido Prefectural Board of Education
Hokkaido Prefectural Sports Center
Hokkaido Railway Company
Hokkaido Shimbun
Hokkaidō Shinkansen
Hokkaido Takushoku Bank
Hokkaido University
Hokkaido University of Education
Hokkaido Utari Association
Hokkaido wolf
Hokku
Hokubo, Okayama
Hokudan, Hyogo
Hokuriku Main Line
Hokuriku region
Hokuriku Shinkansen
Hokusai
Hokuto, Yamanashi
The Hollow Doll
Homosexuality in Japan
Masaharu Homma
Honai, Ehime
Honami, Fukuoka
Honda
Honda Accord
Honda CB series
Honda CB750
Honda Civic
Honda Civic CRX
Honda Civic Hybrid
Honda Element
Honda Insight
Honda Inspire
Honda Integra
Honda Ishiro
Honda Jazz
Honda Prelude
Soichiro Honda
Honda Toshiaki
Honda-kai
Hondo, Kumamoto
Hōnen Shōnin
Hongawa, Kochi
Hongō
Hongo, Hiroshima
Hongo, Yamaguchi
Hongu, Wakayama
Honinbo Sansa
Honinbo Shusaku
Honjō, Nagano
Honjō, Akita
Honjo, Ōita
Honjo, Saitama
Honkawane, Shizuoka
Honne and tatemae
Honshū
Honshū-Shikoku Bridge Project
Honyabakei, Ōita
Horado, Gifu
Horai, Aichi
Kenichi Horie
Mitsuko Horie
Takafumi Horie
Yui Horie
Yuji Horii
Horikawa
Hōryū-ji
Hoshi Sato
Hoshino, Fukuoka
Yukinobu Hoshino
Hoshuyama, Fukuoka
Hosoe, Shizuoka
Hosokawa clan
Hosokawa Gracia
Hosokawa Katsumoto
Morihiro Hosokawa
Haruomi Hosono
Hotei
Hototogisu
Hototogisu (magazine)
Hotsuma Tsutae
Houko Kuwashima
House of Councillors
House of Peers
House of Representatives of Japan
Howl's Moving Castle
Hoya, Tokyo

Hu
Hudson Soft
Hugh Borton
Hull note
Hunter × Hunter

Hy
Yuji Hyakutake
Hyōgo Prefecture
Hyūga Province
Hyūga, Miyazaki
Hylian
Hyoshigi
Hyrule
Hyrule Field

H